A dock connector is a connector used to attach a mobile electronic device simultaneously to multiple external resources. The dock connector will typically carry a variety of signals and power, through a single connector, to simplify the process of docking the mobile device. A dock connector may be embedded in a mechanical fixture used to support or align the mobile device or may be at the end of a cable.

The dock connector was originally associated with laptops, but other mobile devices use the concept.

Laptops 

Classic docking connectors for laptop computers are usually embedded into a mechanical docking station and port replicator devices that supports and aligns the laptop and sports various single-function ports and a power source that are aggregated into the docking connector. Docking connectors would carry interfaces such as keyboard, serial, parallel, and video ports from the laptop and supply power to it.

Current docking connection options usually can be defined as a USB-C port with optional additional functionality.

Mobile devices 
Many mobile devices feature a dock connector.

Dock connectors can be used to interface with accessories such as external speakers, including stereo systems and clock radios. Automotive accessories for mobile devices include charging cradles, FM transmitters for playing audio through the car's speakers, and GPS receivers. There are dock connector cables that offer additional capabilities such as direct integration with the car's audio system and controls.

Apple dock connectors

30-pin dock connector

Apple's proprietary 30-pin connector was common to most Apple mobile devices (iPhone (1st generation), 3G, 3GS, 4, 4S), 1st through 4th generation iPod Touch, iPad, iPad 2, and iPad 3rd gen) from its introduction with the 3rd generation iPod classic in 2003 until the Lightning connector was released in late 2012. Originally, the Apple dock connector carried USB, FireWire, some controls and line-level audio outputs. As the iPod changed, so did the signals in the dock connector. Video was added to the connector. FireWire was phased out of the iPods, which led to a discontinuity in usage of the dock connector.

As a result of the popularity of Apple's iPod and iPhone devices using the connector, a cottage industry was created of third-party devices that could connect to the interface. With the discontinuation of the sixth-generation 160 GB iPod Classic and the iPhone 4S, the last Apple products to feature the original 30-pin connector, the connector was discontinued in September 2014 but the production of 30-pin connectors in India and developing markets still continued until February 2016.

Lightning connector

Apple introduced an 8-pin dock connector, named Lightning, on September 12, 2012, as replacement of the 30-pin dock connector. The iPhone 5 and later, the iPod Touch (5th generation) and later, seventh generation iPod nano, all models of the iPad mini until the 6th generation, the iPad (4th generation) and later, all models of the iPad Air until the 4th Generation and the first two generations of the iPad Pro all use the Lightning connector, as do several Apple accessories. Apple Lightning connector pins can be accessed from both sides of the connector allowing insertion with either side facing up.

Samsung 30-pin dock connector

The Samsung Galaxy Tab and Galaxy Note 30-pin dock/charging connector is very similar to – although not identical with – the non-proprietary PDMI connector. It is unrelated to the Apple 30-pin connector.

Korean standard cellular phone 24-pin and 20-pin dock connectors

The 2001 Korean Telecommunications Technology Association (TTA) "Standard on I/O Connection Interface of Digital Cellular Phone" defined a 24-pin electromechanical interface specifications for cellular phone charging, wired data communication, analog audio, etc. The 2007 updated version has only 20 pins but added composite video output support among other changes.

Portable Digital Media Interface (PDMI)

The Portable Digital Media Interface (PDMI) is a 30-pin interconnection standard for portable media players. It was developed by the Consumer Electronics Association as ANSI/CEA-2017-A, Common Interconnection for Portable Media Players in February 2010. The standard was developed with the input or support of over fifty consumer electronics companies worldwide.

Sony WM-PORT

The WM-PORT is a 22-pin dock connector from Sony, used for the majority of Walkman digital media players since 2006. It provides a data and power connection including to peripherals.

Other dock connectors
 Cowon iAudio 22-pin dock connector
 Creative Zen 30-pin dock connector
 iRiver 18-pin dock connector
 Le Pan 30-pin dock connector
 Microsoft Zune 24-pin dock connector 
 Olympus m:robe series 18-pin dock connector
 Panasonic D-snap port (24-pin)
 Philips GoGear 30-pin dock connector
 SanDisk Sansa 30-pin dock connector
 Sony NW-A1000/3000 Walkman 42-pin multi-connector
 Tatung Elio 26-pin dock connector
 Toshiba Gigabeat 40-pin dock connector

See also
 Docking station
 Common external power supply

References

External links
List of ThinkPad laptops docking ports on ThinkWiki

Docking stations
IPod
IPhone